William Lindsay Cook (11 March 1903 – 1981) was a Scottish professional footballer. An outside left, he began his senior career with Forfar Athletic before joining Dundee in 1925. Cook spent much of his career with Football League club Bolton Wanderers, winning the FA Cup at the end of his first season in 1929, and eventually making 234 League appearances and scoring 35 goals. He later played for Blackpool and Reading before rejoining Dundee in 1939. After the club temporarily closed down due to the Second World War, Cook made several guest appearances for neighbours Dundee United during 1941 while he was stationed locally with the Royal Air Force.

While at Bolton, Cook won three caps for the Scottish national team.

References

1903 births
1981 deaths
Scottish footballers
Dundee North End F.C. players
Forfar Athletic F.C. players
Dundee F.C. players
Bolton Wanderers F.C. players
Blackpool F.C. players
Reading F.C. players
Footballers from Dundee
Association football outside forwards
English Football League players
Scottish Junior Football Association players
Scottish Football League players
Scottish Football League representative players
Scotland international footballers
Dundee United F.C. wartime guest players
Royal Air Force personnel of World War II
FA Cup Final players